European Democrats may refer to:

 European People's Party–European Democrats, (EPP-ED), a political group in the European Parliament. 
 European Democrats, an alliance of European Conservative parties with members in:
  European Democratic Group, (ED), a political group of the European Parliament that collapsed in 1992, 
  European Democrats, (ED), a subgroup of EPP-ED in the European Parliament since 1992,
  European Democrat Group, (EDG) a still-extant political group of the Parliamentary Assembly of the Council of Europe.
 SNK Evropští demokraté, (SNK ED), a Czech political party.
 European Democrats (Georgia), a political party in the country of Georgia
 Európska Demokratická Strana (EDS), a Slovak political party.
 Evropští demokraté (ED), a former Czech political party and predecessor of SNK ED.
 Europeans United for Democracy (EUD), formerly EUDemocrats, a Eurosceptic transnational party at a European level.
 European Democratic Party, (EDP), a centrist transnational party at a European level. 
 European Democrat Union, (EDU), a European wing of the International Democrat Union.